Unami was an Algonquian language spoken by the Lenape people in the late 17th century and the early 18th century, in what then was (or later became) the southern two-thirds of New Jersey, southeastern Pennsylvania and the northern two-thirds of Delaware, but later in Ontario and Oklahoma. It is one of the two Delaware languages, the other being Munsee. The last fluent speaker in the United States, Edward Thompson, of the Delaware Tribe of Indians, died on August 31, 2002. His sister Nora Thompson Dean (1907–1984) provided valuable information about the language to linguists and other scholars.

 literally means 'Men of Men', but is translated to mean 'Original People'. New Jersey), which means 'water's edge', and Lenapehoking, meaning 'in the land of the Delaware Indians'. It describes the ancient homeland of all Delaware Indians, both Unami and Munsee. The English named the river running through much of the traditional range of the Lenape after the first governor of the Jamestown Colony, Lord De La Warr, and consequently referred to the people who lived around the river as "Delaware Indians".

History
Unami is an Eastern Algonquian language. The hypothetical common ancestor language from which the Eastern Algonquian languages descend is Proto-Eastern Algonquian (PEA). An intermediate group, Delawarean, that is a descendant of Proto-Eastern Algonquian consists of Mahican and Common Delaware, the latter being a further subgroup comprising Munsee Delaware and Unami Delaware. The justification for Delawarean as an intermediate subgroup rests upon the high degree of similarity between Mahican and the two Delaware languages, but relatively little detailed argumentation in support of Delawarean has been adduced.

Compared to Munsee, Unami has undergone extensive phonological innovation, coupled with morphological regularization.

The PEA vowel system consisted of four long vowels *i·, *o·, *e·, *a·,  and two short vowels *a and ə. The vowel history is as follows: *i· (from PEA merger of Proto-Algonquian (PA *i· and *i to PEA *i·), *o· (from PEA merger of PA *o· and *o ), *e· (from Proto-Algonquian *e·), and *a· (from Proto-Algonquian *a·; the short vowels are*ə (from Proto-Algonquian *e), and *a (from Proto-Algonquian *a). This system was continued down to Common Delaware, but Munsee and Unami have innovated separately with respect to the vowel systems.

Revival attempts
The dominant modern version of the Southern Unami dialect called Lenape is taught by the Delaware Tribe of Indians, headquartered in Bartlesville, Oklahoma. They have the Lenape Language Preservation Project. The same dialect was spoken by the Delaware Nation in Anadarko in the southwestern part of Oklahoma. Both Oklahoma and Delaware tribes have recorded native speakers and produced written lessons for instruction, which are available for sale from Various Indian Peoples Publishing Company, which is in Texas. These efforts, in conjunction with other community efforts comprise an attempt to preserve the language.

Some descriptions of the Northern Unami dialect as spoken during the 18th century are given by Moravian missionary John Heckewelder.

Phonology

Consonants
Unami has been analyzed as having contrastive geminate and non-geminate obstruent consonants, although this contrast is relatively weak. A full analysis of the status of the geminates, also known as long consonants, is not available, and more than one analysis of Delaware consonants has been proposed. Some examples of contrastive geminate pairs include:  'then you (sg.) danced' versus  'then there was dancing';  'his thigh' versus  'the ham'; and  'I stuck it out repeatedly' versus  'I stuck it out slowly'.

There are also rules that lengthen consonants in certain environments. The length mark  is used to indicate gemination of a preceding consonant or vowel length, although in the literature on Unami the raised dot (·) is often used for these purposes, as other diacritics may be used above vowels (see below). 
  
In the following chart, the usual transcription used in the sources is given with the IPA in brackets.

Vowels
Unami vowels are presented as organized into contrasting long–short pairs. One asymmetry is that high short  is paired with long , and the pairing of long and short  is noteworthy. Additionally, vowels are classified as strong and weak, which plays an important role in determining stress (see below). Long vowels and vowels before consonant clusters are automatically strong. Certain short vowels, which are differentiated with a breve –  – are also strong vowels because they are treated morphophonemically as long vowels, even though they are pronounced as short.

Furthermore, some short vowels are strong even in a weakening environment; such exceptions are often marked with a grave accent. Additionally, some vowels which are unaffected by predicted vowel syncope are marked with an acute accent.

Syllable structure
Syllable structure is diverse, permitting a certain amount of consonant clustering. The following consonant clusters can occur:
 (which are realized as homorganic nasals) + 
 + 
 + 
 + 
 + 

Additionally, certain consonants may combine with the semivowel .
 +

Stress
Stress is generally predictable in Unami. The rightmost nonfinal strong vowel is stressed, or a strong vowel in final position if it is the only one in the word. Often when stress would be expected to fall on the antepenult it is shifted to the penult. In the last case, the accent shifts to the penultimate  only if it would otherwise fall on an antepenultimate short vowel, and if the consonant between them is voiced.

Phonological processes
Unami phonology is extremely complex, with various morphophonological rules, and a theoretical form usually undergoes a set of predictable phonological processes to produce the true form found in speech. There are about 17 such rules common to both Munsee and Unami, and another 28 unique to Unami, though this analysis ignores predictable exceptions, such as the class of static words which may skip many of these rules. These rules govern things such as consonant lengthening/shortening, vowel syncopation, metathesis, vowel coloring, etc.

A list of processes unique to Unami follow. Note that these are written in linguistic notation. In some notations the pound symbol (#) appears, indicating word boundaries (either the beginning or end). Regular parenthesis indicate optional conditions when framing phonemes or additional information about phonemes: "C=stop". The capital letters C, V, and N mean 'consonant', 'vowel', and 'nasal' respectively.

U-1: Weak and strong vowel marking
U-2: Weak short vowel loss before gutturals  and :  ('you walk upstream') versus  ('he walks upstream')
{ə,a} when  are weak→ ∅ / _{h, x}V
Cf.
ə → i / _ {y}
ə → o / _ h{p, kw, m, w}
ə → i / _ h elsewhere
ə → o / _ {Np, Nkw} and  // w_Nk
ə → i / _ Nk elsewhere
ə → o / _x{p, kw}
ə → a / _x elsewhere
U-4: Vowel shortening before primary cluster of a nasal and another consonant
V̅ → V̌ / _ NC
U-5: Semivowel assimilation
{w, y}h → hh / V̌_
U-6: Stop lengthening
C^(vl≠h) → C· / V_(s, š, x) where V is strong
U-7: /h/-metathesis
V̌hC → hV̌C except  / VC_ where V is weak
V → V̌ / _hC (voiced C)
V → V̅ / _hC (voiceless C)
U-9: -loss before stop consonant
hC (C=stop) → C
U-10: Nasal assimilation, part 1
NC (C=stop) → homorganic nasal + voiced stop
NC (C=continuant) → nC / V_
U-11: Vowel-weakening and syncope (with certain exceptions)
a → ah / CV ( is weak; C=voiceless) except some a (a=weak) → ∅ / #n_CV (C=voiceless)
ə → ∅ / _CV ( is weak; C=voiceless) and  / l_{n, l}, y_l, w_w, m_m and  / #(n)_{n, l}V
U-12: Nasal assimilation, part 2
nC (C=voiceless; C≠) → homorganic nasal + C (C=voiced) / #_
VnC → Ṽ·C (most speakers)
U-13: Voiced consonant assimilation
C(x)C(y) (C=voiced constituant) → CyCy
U-14: Vowel syncope before , in which exceptions are marked with a grave accent
V̌ → ∅ / _{x, s, š}CV except  / VC_ (where V=weak)
U-15: -loss in clusters
h → ∅ / _{CC, C#, Cah}
U-16: Vowel shortening
V̅ → V̌ / _h(ə)CV and // _CC (C=voiced) and  / _C·ah
U-17: -loss
V́hməna· → V́hna·
U-18: -insertion
∅ → ə / h_{l, n, m} and  / #{l, m}_C (C≠h)
Does not affect the roots  'well' and  'pull'.
w(ə)C1(w) → Cw / #_V if C1=
w(ə)C → Cw / #_{ah, a, a·}
{, } → {nw, kw} / #_{ah, a, a·}
w{h, x} → {hw, xw} / C_
x → xw / o(·)_
(k)wx(k) → (k)x(k)w / #_
U-20: -coloring of -vowels and -loss
w{ah, a, a·} → {oh, ɔ, ɔ·} / {#,C,V}_ where C is not  and V is not 
w → ∅ / V1_V2 where V1 is not  and V2 is not 
w → ∅ / (C)_o(·)
U-21: -adjustment
y → ∅ / V̄_V1 where V1 is not 
∅ → y / V1_V2 where V1 is a front vowel and V2 is a back vowel
w → y / _k (only in the suffixes 1 and 1)
U-22: Final -loss.
l → (l) / _#
U-23: Final-vowel shortening
V̄ → V̆ / _#
U-24: Final -, -, and -loss
h → ∅ / _#
w → (w) / V̄_#
w → ∅ / o(·)_#
w → ∅ / #_tə{l, n}
y → ∅ / i_#
U-25: Initial cluster and syllable loss. Initial clusters arising from morphophonemic rules U-11 and U-14 above are simplified; many initial weak-vowel syllables are lost. There are many exceptions, however, such that Goddard does not attempt to describe the pattern.
U-26: Consonant-shortening
C·(w) → C(w) / _{ah, oh, C, #}
U-27: Consonant-lengthening
C (C=stop) → C· / #(C)hV̆_V(C)#
U-28: Negative vowel assimilation in forms with 5, which was a recent innovation at the time Goddard was writing.
V̄x(w)i → V̄xV̆x / _#

Morphology

Nouns
Third person participants are marked for gender (animate versus inanimate), obviation (proximate versus obviative), and presence (nonabsentative versus absentative). Generally, the inanimate, obviative, and absentative categories are more marked than their opposites (i.e. animate, proximate, and nonabsentative), but it is not clear whether animacy or inanimacy is the more marked of the opposition. The first and second persons are not marked for presence or obviation and are always animate.

Obviation
The first mentioned and/or primary animate third person is proximate; all other third persons are obviative, unless they act in conjunction with the proximate participant. Verbs are also inflected to indicate whether the verbal action is proximate on obviate or obviate on proximate.

Presence
Third-person participants can be marked by a special set of endings indicating their absence from the general area of the focus of discourse. For example, absentative endings are used when speaking of the deceased (even if the corpse is physically present), as in the sentence  ('our (excl.) mother (abv.) treated us well'), in which both verb and noun are marked with the absentative  ending.

Gender
Nouns in Unami are classified as animate or inanimate, which is reflected in verbal conjugation. (However, berries, nuts, and vegetables growing above ground are generally inanimate.) However, traditionally inanimate nouns which are directly addressed or personified are treated as animate. Thus, traditionally inanimate  ('stone') is treated as animate in the sentence  ('the stones would immediately cry out').

Verbs
Unami is a highly agglutinative, polysynthetic language. Verbs in Unami are marked for person and number, and contain inflectional elements of order (independent, conjunct, and imperative), aspect, and the negative.

A table of the personal pronouns is given below. The first person plural ("we") may be either inclusive (including the addressee) or exclusive.

Following are tables exemplifying verbal paradigms in Unami in the independent order, indicative mood and present tense.

Animate intransitive (AI) verbs

Transitive animate (TA) verbs

Inanimate intransitive (II) verbs

Transitive inanimate (TI) verbs
The TI themes have the same inflection as AI stems for all conjuncts. (Indefinite subject forms of consonant-final themes are not attested, but the vowel-final themes follow the AI pattern.) Three forms are illustrated from each type.

Affixes

Prefixes
Verbal prefixes are used only in the independent order, although some forms of the independent order lack a prefix. Sometimes, this  contracts with a stem-initial  to  except when the  would be phonetically shortened via rule U-4a. Examples include:  ('I get up from lying') versus  ('he gets up'). ('that is where we live [our lives]') from the animate intransitive stem .

Prefixes are mutually exclusive and are selected based on the following rule: if one of the participants is second person, the second person prefix is used; if not, if one of the participants is the first person, then the first person prefix is used; if none of these applies, other forms, if they take a prefix, take the third person prefix. This is the well-known Algonquian 2-1-3 precedence rule.

Suffixes
Suffixes are grouped into eight positional classes. These are:
Theme
 Theme signs
Thematic affixes
 Diminutive and pejorative
 Obviative and plural
 Negative; imperative modes
Desinences (inflectional suffixes)
 Central endings
 Aspect
 Peripheral endings
 Mode

First position
The first position (theme signs) is filled only for transitive verbs and help describe the relationship between the two participants by indicating which is the agent and which is the object. The direct and inverse theme signs indicate the direction of the verb along a spectrum what might be called distance. From least to most distant the participants are: (1) first or second; (2) indefinite (only as subject); (3) proximate third person; (4) obviative third person; (5) farther obviative third person; (6) inanimate (subject only). If the subject is less distant than the object, the direct theme is used; if the subject is more distant, the inverse signs are used. After transitive animate (TA) verb stems appear one of the four following theme signs:
Theme 1: 1 ~ 1; makes direct forms
Theme 2: 1 ~ 1; makes inverse forms
Theme 3: 1; makes first person object forms
Theme 4:  1; makes second person forms

For transitive inanimate (TI) verbs, there appears the theme sign pertaining to the appropriate TI class:
Class 1a: 1
Class 1b: 1
Class 2: 1 ~ 1
Class 3: no theme sign
For Class 2 TI theme signs, in certain derivational categories, the theme sign is retained even when the thematic element is dropped. The contrast between both categories is sharper in the Central Algonquian languages, whose theme sign has a more complex series of alternants.

Second position

Third position
In position three are the affixes 3, which marks the obviative third person, and 3, which marks the plural.

Fourth position
Position four contains the negative affix 4 and prohibitive imperative and future imperative forms, which have complex series of alternants.

Fifth position
Position five contains the central endings which index the central participant of each form, except those using TA theme signs 1 and 1;

Sixth position
Position six contains the affix endings:  marks the preterite, and  ~  mark the present.

Seventh position
Position seven contains peripheral endings, which are used to mark the nominal category of some 3rd person participants in forms in the independent and conjunct (but not imperative) orders.

Eighth position
Position eight reflects the subjunctive, prohibitive, and future modes.

Syntax
Unami is, like many Algonquian languages, polysynthetic and highly agglutinative. This means that most of the information is encoded in the verb (sometimes with whole words being incorporated into the stem), making word order more fluid than in English. Unfortunately, syntax is one of the least studied aspects of the Unami language; there is much more data on morphology, because of an especial focus on reconstructing Proto-Algonquian.

Some examples of complex sentences in Unami include:
 ('what color are those beads?')
 ('over there under the trees two people were buried')
 ('but the children's footprints are numerous')
 ('then that's what those boys did')

Notes

References

Goddard, Ives. 1979. Delaware Verbal Morphology. New York: Garland. [published version of 1969 Harvard University dissertation in linguistics] 
 Goddard, Ives. 1997. "Pidgin Delaware." Sarah G. Thomason, ed., Contact Languages: A Wider Perspective, pp. 43–98. Amsterdam: John Benjamins Publishing Company. 

Lenape Texts & Studies - Northern Unami (Mission Delaware) works

External links

Delaware (Lenape) Tribe of Indians
Delaware Nation of Oklahoma
Lenape Talking Dictionary
Native Languages page for Lenape
History of our lord and saviour Jesus Christ Translation of the Gospels into the Delaware language. Printed by Jotham Meeker, Shawnee Baptist Mission.
OLAC resources in and about the Unami language

Lenape
Eastern Algonquian languages
Indigenous languages of the North American eastern woodlands
Indigenous languages of the North American Plains
Indigenous languages of Oklahoma
Indigenous languages of Pennsylvania
Indigenous languages of Maryland
Agglutinative languages
Extinct languages of North America
Languages extinct in the 2000s